Des Peres is a city in west St. Louis County, Missouri, United States. The population was 8,373 at the 2010 census.

History
The first inhabitants of Des Peres were the Cahokia, the Kaskaskia, the Mitchigamea, the Moingona, and the Otoe peoples. As well as the Missouria, and Osage, and Tamaroa peoples.

The Osage Nation lived in the area around Des Peres. The Osage were members of the Dhegiha Sioux group of tribes. This group also included the Ponca tribe, Quapaw tribe, Kansas tribe, and Omaha tribe.

Des Peres is thought to be the oldest white settlement in Missouri, founded about December 3, 1700 by a group of Kaskaskia Native Americans and French who had left the camp of the confederated Illinois tribes on the Illinois River. The settlement was called Des Peres, French for "The Fathers," and meant to honor the French Jesuit missionaries who settled there. This settlement was at the mouth of River des Peres and it is thought the first settlers found this region unhealthful, so moved across the Mississippi River to a prairie about 25 miles from the mouth of the Kaskaskia River.

People of European descent began settling in Des Peres in the 1800s. By 1850, there were 75,000 people living in St. Louis. Des Peres was mainly settled by German immigrants and southerners from Virginia and the Carolinas who were drawn to the area by the farmland sold off by the United States government in  tracts.

Des Peres got its name from the River des Peres whose tributaries, Deer Creek and Two Mile Creek, ran through the town.  The name Des Pères is a French term which means "of the Fathers".

In 1834 a small church, the Des Peres Presbyterian Church, 38°37′22″N 90°25′12″W
(Old Des Peres Church;Old Stone Church) is a historic church on Geyer Road in Frontenac, Missouri.

It was started in 1834 and was added to the National Register in 1978.

Mark Becker has been mayor of the city since 2018.

Geography
Des Peres is located at  (38.596023, -90.447299), at an altitude of  MSL and is in the Central Time Zone.

Demographics

2000 census
As of the census of 2000, there were 8,592 people, 3,004 households, and 2,532 families residing in the city. The racial makeup of the city was 96.55% White, 0.79% African American, 0.19% Native American, 1.83% Asian, 0.03% Pacific Islander, 0.15% from other races, and 0.45% from two or more races. Hispanic or Latino of any race were 0.83% of the population.

There were 3,004 households, out of which 39.2% had children under the age of 18 living with them, 76.2% were married couples living together, 6.1% had a female householder with no husband present, and 15.7% were non-families. 13.5% of all households were made up of individuals, and 7.3% had someone living alone who was 65 years of age or older. The average household size was 2.83 and the average family size was 3.12.

In the city the population was spread out, with 27.7% under the age of 18, 5.3% from 18 to 24, 21.5% from 25 to 44, 30.1% from 45 to 64, and 15.4% who were 65 years of age or older. The median age was 42 years. For every 100 females, there were 94.1 males. For every 100 females age 18 and over, there were 91.6 males.

The median income for a household in the city was $96,433, and the median income for a family was $106,195. Males had a median income of $79,465 versus $40,563 for females. The per capita income for the city was $40,916. About 0.8% of families and 1.5% of the population were below the poverty line, including 1.5% of those under age 18 and 0.4% of those age 65 or over.

2010 census
As of the census of 2010, there were 8,373 people, 3,051 households, and 2,474 families residing in the city. The racial makeup of the city was 94.3% White, 0.9% African American, 0.2% Native American, 3.1% Asian, 0.3% from other races, and 1.2% from two or more races. Hispanic or Latino of any race were 1.3% of the population.

There were 3,051 households, of which 35.3% had children under the age of 18 living with them, 72.6% were married couples living together, 6.2% had a female householder with no husband present, 2.3% had a male householder with no wife present, and 18.9% were non-families. 16.4% of all households were made up of individuals, and 7.8% had someone living alone who was 65 years of age or older. The average household size was 2.72 and the average family size was 3.06.

The median age in the city was 45.9 years. 26.2% of residents were under the age of 18; 5% were between the ages of 18 and 24; 17.7% were from 25 to 44; 34% were from 45 to 64; and 17.2% were 65 years of age or older. The gender makeup of the city was 48.5% male and 51.5% female.

Government
The current head of the Des Peres government is Mayor Mark Becker. The government includes the following elected officials:  Alderman John Pound and Ben Sansone - Ward 1, Alderman Jim Kleinschmidt and Dean Fitzpatrick - Ward 2, Alderman Patrick Barrett and Sean Concagh - Ward 3. The City also operates under the Mayor/Council/Administrator form of government, and has since 1973. Under this model the City Administrator serves as the Chief Administrative Officer and is responsible for overseeing the day-to-day operations of the city, which may include dealing with financial, legislative, legal, or personnel matters as they arise. Douglas Harms has served as City Administrator since 1985.

Schools
The public schools serving Des Peres are Parkway School District and Kirkwood R-7 School District.  
Two private schools exist both with religious affiliations. St. Clement of Rome School is run by its adjoining church and parish under the direction of the Roman Catholic Archdiocese of St. Louis. It houses students from pre-kindergarten to eighth grade. St. Paul's Lutheran School also houses students from pre-kindergarten to eighth grade and is affiliated with the Lutheran Church–Missouri Synod.

Economy
The international headquarters of Edward Jones Investments is located in Des Peres.

West County Center, a shopping mall, was established here in 1969

The international headquarters of Redbird Engineering is located in Des Peres.

Taxes
The City of Des Peres does not assess a real or personal property tax and has not since 1995:  67% School District; 13% Special Schools; 7% St. Louis County; 4% Community College; 4% Zoo/Museum District; 2% County Library; 2% MSD; 1% Sheltered Workshops.

Culture
The city is the birthplace of actress Tracy Posner.

Parks and recreation

Des Peres maintains six separate parks:  Des Peres Park, Harwood Park, Pioneer Park, Sugar Creek Park, as well as the 13 acre Phantom Forest and the 10 acre Bittersweet Woods conservation areas.  Both designated "urban wildlife areas" are administered in cooperation with the Missouri Department of Conservation and run adjacent to Dougherty Lake, one of the original residential developments in Des Peres.  The sites and trails for both sites are accessible to the public only via Barrett Station Road entrance. Bittersweet Woods was donated by Des Peres residents Jean and Joan Goodson.  Phantom Forest was donated by Des Peres residents Claire and Ray Moore after Ray Moore's death. It is named after  the Phantom comic strip, of which Ray Moore was the co-creator (with Lee Falk) and original illustrator.

The Lodge is a community center that includes indoor and outdoor aquatic facilities, fitness center, gymnasium, and meeting rooms.

Jar Of Pickles 
On Interstate 270 outside of Des Peres, near the West County Center, is a jar of pickles on a highway guardrail. Whenever the jar is damaged or goes missing, it is replaced by the locals. The jar appeared circa 2012, and has been replaced many times since. There is a group on Facebook dedicated to the jar known as "Team Pickle".

References

External links
 City of Des Peres official website

Cities in St. Louis County, Missouri
French colonial settlements of Upper Louisiana
Cities in Missouri